Grizzly Flats may refer to:
Grizzly Flats Railroad
Grizzly Flats, California